Kendriya Vidyalaya Mangaldoi is a school situated in the Block Chowk area of Mangaldoi, Assam. It was established in 2003 under civil sector located at Mangaldoi. It is under the Kendriya Vidyalaya Sangathan which is under the Ministry of Human Resource Development. The school is affiliated to the Central Board of Secondary Education. It has classes from I to XII. The science and humanities stream are available in the senior secondary section. Senior secondary section was started from the academic year 2014–2015.

References
Kendriya Vidyalayas
Schools in Assam
Darrang district
2003 establishments in Assam
Educational institutions established in 2003